Helene Duhamel (born 1962) is an American politician and journalist serving as a member of the South Dakota Senate from the 32nd district.

Early life and education 
A native of Rapid City, South Dakota, attended St. Martin's Academy. She earned a Bachelor of Arts degree in communication and international relations from Stanford University in 1984.

Career 
After graduating from college, she worked as a news anchor for KDUH in Scottsbluff, Nebraska. In 1989, she returned to Rapid City.

Duhamel was appointed to the Senate by Governor Kristi Noem in 2019 to fill the vacancy left by Alan Solano. Duhamel had previously served as a television news anchor for KOTA-TV and as the public information office for the Pennington County Sheriff’s Office.

Electoral History 
In 2020, Duhamel ran for re-election to the South Dakota State Senate to represent District 32; she was unopposed in the Republican primary. Duhamel beat Democratic challenger Michael Calabrese by 64% to 36%. Calabrese was a small business owner and served on the Rapid City Board of Parks and Recreation.

Legislative History

2020 Legislative Session 
After her appointment to the State Senate, Duhamel represented District 32 during the 2020 South Dakota Legislative Session. 

Duhamel also served on the Local Government Interim Committee and as the Vice Chair of the Health and Human Services Interim Committee. 

In 2020, all four pieces of legislation that Duhamel prime sponsored were passed into law and signed by the Governor Kristi Noem.

References 

Living people
1962 births
People from Rapid City, South Dakota
Stanford University alumni
Republican Party South Dakota state senators
21st-century American politicians
21st-century American women politicians
American women television presenters
American television news anchors
20th-century American journalists
21st-century American journalists
Journalists from South Dakota
20th-century American women